Roller Hockey International was a professional inline hockey league that operated in North America from 1993 to 1999. It was the first major professional league for inline hockey.

History 
League president Dennis Murphy had been involved in the establishment of the American Basketball Association, World Hockey Association and World TeamTennis. RHI hoped to capitalize on the inline skating boom of the early 1990s. Key parts of its success were its stance on no guaranteed contracts, instead teams would all split prize money.

Teams were generally made up of minor league ice hockey players playing on inline skates during the summer months between ice seasons.

Murphy saw big potential for the sport and believed that inline hockey could become the number one hockey sport in the US. The league had plans to expand to up to 24 teams, including some from Europe, by 1997. However, RHI became known for its unstable franchises, instability in the league's front office itself, little media coverage and many teams struggling to attract crowds - while the Anaheim Bullfrogs led in attendance with an average of 9,800 per game, seven teams attracted less than 4,000 per game on average, while the whole league's attendance averaged around 5,000 by 1996.

Ultimately, after five seasons of play and a fading in the inline skating boom, RHI folded in 1998 with two of its franchises joining Major League Roller Hockey: the Buffalo Wings and its premier club, the Anaheim Bullfrogs. RHI was revived in 1999, with a 10-team roster that included five holdovers that had played in RHI in 1997: the Anaheim Bullfrogs, Buffalo Wings, Minnesota Blue Ox, San Jose Rhinos and St. Louis Vipers.

The league cancelled the 2000 season and the league finally ceased operations in 2001 when their sites were limited to arenas in California.

The St. Louis Vipers were resurrected in 2020 as an expansion team of the National Roller Hockey League.

Rules
The rules in the RHI were similar to but not identical to those of ice hockey. Besides the obvious difference of playing on a floor instead of ice, the RHI had four players and a goalie at a time on the playing surface opposed to ice hockey's five and a goalie. Minor penalties were only a minute and a half as opposed to two minutes and major penalties were four minutes instead of five.

There were no blue lines and therefore no offside; however, there was still illegal clearing (icing) and a different version of offside—a player could skate over the red line before the puck; however, the player couldn't receive a pass over the line. The puck itself was lighter, at 3 oz. and made of red plastic as opposed to a 5 oz. black rubber ice hockey puck. There were four 12-minute quarters opposed to the NHL's three 20-minute periods. A tied score at the end of regulation time in the regular season would go straight to a shootout instead of overtime.

The playoffs followed a best-of-three series format; however, the third game was not a full 48 minute game. Instead it was just a regular 12-minute quarter called "the mini game". If the teams were tied at the end of the quarter a sudden-death overtime period would follow.

Teams
Note: RHI 1993-97, revived RHI 1999

 Anaheim Bullfrogs (1993–1997; 1999)
 Calgary Rad'z (1993–1994)
 Connecticut Coasters (1993) / Sacramento River Rats (1994–1997)
 Florida Hammerheads (1993–1994)
 Los Angeles Blades (1993–1997; 1999)
 Oakland Skates (1993–1996)
 Portland Rage (1993–1994)
 San Diego Barracudas (1993–1996) / Ontario Barracudas (1998–99)
 St. Louis Vipers (1993–1997; 1999)
 Toronto Planets (1993)
 Utah Rollerbees (1993) / Las Vegas Flash (1994)
 Vancouver Voodoo (1993–1996)
 Atlanta Fire Ants (1994) / Oklahoma Coyotes (1995–1996) / Las Vegas Coyotes (1999)
 Buffalo Stampede (1994–1995)
 Chicago Cheetahs (1994–1995)
 Edmonton Sled Dogs (1994) / Orlando Rollergators (1995, renamed Orlando Jackals 1996–1997)
 Minnesota Arctic Blast (1994; 1996)
 Montreal Roadrunners (1994–1997)
 New England Stingers (1994) / Ottawa Loggers (1995–1996, renamed Ottawa Wheels in 1997)
 New Jersey Rockin' Rollers (1994–1997)
 Philadelphia Bulldogs (1994–1996)
 Phoenix Cobras (1994–1995) / Empire State Cobras (1996) / Buffalo Wings (1997; 1999)
 Pittsburgh Phantoms (1994)
 San Jose Rhinos (1994–1997; 1999)
 Tampa Bay Tritons (1994)
 Minnesota Blue Ox (1995; 1999)
 Detroit Motor City Mustangs (1995)
 Denver Daredevils (1996–1997)
 Long Island Jawz (1996–1997)
 Chicago Bluesmen (1999)
 Dallas Stallions (1999)

Expansion

Conferences
The Eastern Conference and Western Conference were created when RHI doubled in size to 24 teams in 1994 after its first series of expansion and realigned its teams into two conferences and four divisions. Prior to the 1994 realignment, Roller Hockey International divided its teams into only three divisions and no conferences.

From 1994 through 1996, the Eastern Conference was divided into the Atlantic Division and the Central Division, which were both successors to the Murphy Division. Starting in 1997, the conferences had no divisions.

From 1994 through 1996, the Western Conference comprised teams divided into two divisions: Northwest Division and Pacific Division. Starting in 1997 the conferences had no divisions.

Eastern Conference champions
 1994 - Buffalo Stampede (won Cup)
 1995 - Montreal Roadrunners
 1996 - Orlando Jackals (won Cup)
 1997 - New Jersey Rockin' Rollers
 1998 - No Season
 1999 - St. Louis Vipers (won Cup)

Western Conference champions
 1994 - Portland Rage
 1995 - San Jose Rhinos (won Cup)
 1996 - Anaheim Bullfrogs
 1997 - Anaheim Bullfrogs (won Cup)
 1998 - No Season
 1999 - Anaheim Bullfrogs

Murphy Cup championship winners
1993 - Anaheim Bullfrogs def. Oakland Skates
1994 - Buffalo Stampede def. Portland Rage
1995 - San Jose Rhinos def. Montreal Roadrunners
1996 - Orlando Jackals def. Anaheim Bullfrogs
1997 - Anaheim Bullfrogs def. New Jersey Rockin' Rollers
1998 - No season (MLRH Champion: Anaheim Bullfrogs)
1999 - St. Louis Vipers def. Anaheim Bullfrogs

Licensing 
The league inspired at least one video game, Super Nintendo's RHI Roller Hockey '95, although the game was never released.

There was also a call-in style stats, scores and interview hotline where fans could call in following games. The phone number was 1-800-741-4RHI. This line was updated nightly following each game.

Media coverage

In the 1994 and '95 seasons, there was a regular schedule of games on ESPN2.  Craig Minervini was the lead play-by-play man for ESPN2 coverage and also hosted the recap show RHI Rewind on the network.

In addition, several teams had their own radio or TV contracts.  For example, a number of Blades home games were seen on Prime Sports and the Bullfrogs had radio broadcasts from 1994 to '96.

NHL alumni

Ralph Barahona
Daniel Berthiaume
Francis Bouillon
Darren Banks
Frank Caprice
Jose Charbonneau
Ross Earl
Nick Fotiu
Victor Gerves
Stefan Grogg NLA and (National Team, Switzerland)
Radek Hamr
Mike Kennedy
Sasha Lakovic
Darren Langdon
Manny Legace
Alain Lemieux
Glen Metropolit
Tyler Moss
Steve Poapst
Walt Poddubny
Al Secord
Paul Skidmore
Peter Skudra
Bryan Trottier
Perry Turnbull
Dave "Tiger" Williams
Rick Wilson
Bob Woods
Harry York

See also
List of Roller Hockey International arenas

References

External links
RHI statistics
RHI at The Internet Hockey Database
Roller Hockey photo archive by Shelly Castellano

 
Sports leagues established in 1993
Sports leagues disestablished in 1999
1993 establishments in North America
Defunct sports leagues in the United States
Defunct professional sports leagues in the United States
Inline hockey leagues in the United States
1999 disestablishments in North America